Top Country Albums is a chart that ranks the top-performing country music albums in the United States, published by Billboard.  In 1989, eight different albums topped the chart, based on sales reports submitted by a representative sample of stores nationwide.

In the issue of Billboard dated January 7, Randy Travis returned to number one with Old 8×10, displacing the final chart-topper of 1988, Loving Proof by Ricky Van Shelton.  Travis's album spent eight consecutive weeks in the top spot, having already spent the same length of time at number one in the fall of 1988.  Travis would return to the top of the chart in November with No Holdin' Back, which spent the final nine weeks of 1989 at number one; he was the only act with more than one chart-topper during the year and his total of 17 weeks at number one was the most by any act during 1989.  The longest unbroken run atop the listing was achieved by Reba McEntire, whose album Sweet Sixteen was in the top spot for 13 consecutive weeks beginning in June.

In September, Clint Black topped the chart for the first time with his debut album Killin' Time.  It would spend six consecutive weeks at number one before being displaced from the top spot by Randy Travis's No Holdin' Back, but would return to the top spot in 1990 and add a further 25 weeks to its total, making it the second longest-running Top Country Albums number one to date.  Having signed his first major-label record deal in 1988, Black almost immediately experienced great success, topping the country singles and albums charts and winning a string of major awards; he is seen as one of the first in a new generation of country artists who brought greatly-increased mainstream popularity to the genre in the 1990s.

Chart history

References

1989
1989 record charts